Saga is a genus of bush crickets or katydids containing around 15 species . It is the only genus in the tribe Sagini and belongs to the subfamily Saginae.  Species have been recorded from mainland Europe and western Asia.

Species
Species include:
Saga beieri Kaltenbach, 1967
Saga campbelli Uvarov, 1921
Saga cappadocica Werner, 1903
Saga ephippigera Fischer von Waldheim, 1846
Saga gracilis Kis, 1962
Saga hakkarica Sirin & Taylan, 2019
Saga hellenica Kaltenbach, 1967
Saga ledereri Saussure, 1888
Saga longicaudata Krauss, 1879
Saga natoliae Serville, 1838
Saga ornata Burmeister, 1838
Saga pedo (Pallas, 1771)
Saga puella Werner, 1901
Saga quadrisignata Philippi, 1863
Saga rammei Kaltenbach, 1965
Saga rhodiensis Salfi, 1929

References

Tettigoniidae
Tettigoniidae genera
Orthoptera of Europe